The Faculty of Protestant Theology in Brussels (FUTP), in Brussels, Belgium, is a private university. Its official languages are French and Dutch.

Sources

 Faculty of Protestant Theology in Brussels

Faculty of Protestant Theology in Brussels
Buildings and structures in Brussels
Universities and colleges in Brussels
Protestant seminaries and theological colleges